Tolypeutinae is a subfamily of armadillos in the family Chlamyphoridae, consisting of the giant, three-banded and naked-tailed armadillos.



Taxonomy
It contains the following genera:
Cabassous
Kuntinaru
Priodontes
Tolypeutes
Vetelia

Phylogeny
Tolypeutinae is the sister group of Chlamyphorinae, the fairy armadillos, as shown below.

References

Armadillos
Extant Chattian first appearances